Stolnik Peak is the peak rising to 2624 m in the east foothills of Craddock Massif in Sentinel Range, Ellsworth Mountains in Antarctica.  Situated on the side ridge running eastwards from Mount Craddock.  The peak is overlooking Sowers Glacier to the northwest and Saltzman Glacier to the south.

The peak is named after the settlement of Stolnik in Western Bulgaria.

Location
US mapping in 1961, updated in 1988.

Maps
 Vinson Massif.  Scale 1:250 000 topographic map.  Reston, Virginia: US Geological Survey, 1988.
 Antarctic Digital Database (ADD). Scale 1:250000 topographic map of Antarctica. Scientific Committee on Antarctic Research (SCAR). Since 1993, regularly updated.

Notes

References
 Bulgarian Antarctic Gazetteer. Antarctic Place-names Commission. (details in Bulgarian, basic data in English)
 Stolnik Peak. SCAR Composite Antarctic Gazetteer.

External links
 Stolnik Peak. Copernix satellite image

Ellsworth Mountains
Mountains of Ellsworth Land
Bulgaria and the Antarctic